The 2015–16 DEL2 season was the third season since the founding of the DEL2, the second tier of German ice hockey, set below the Deutsche Eishockey Liga.

The regular season started on 11 September 2015 and was completed on 1 March 2016, followed by the play-offs, which finished on 22 April 2016 with EC Kassel Huskies winning the league title.

In the 2015–16 season the league was the best-supported second-tier ice hockey league in Europe with an average of 2,688 spectators per game.

Modus
Fourteen teams played a regular season where each team played the other twice home and away. The teams placed first to sixth directly qualified for the play-offs while the teams placed seventh to tenth played a pre-play-off in the best-of-three format. The remained of the play-offs were staged in a best-of-seven format. The teams placed eleventh to fourteenth qualified for the play-downs, also played in the best-of-seven format with the losers of the first round advancing to the second. The loser of the second round was nominally relegated, but Heilbronn retained its league place once more after the Fischtown Penguins were elevated to the DEL for the following season.

The league champion does not have the right for direct promotion to the Deutsche Eishockey Liga but, in September 2015, the DEL and DEL2 agreed to reintroduce promotion and relegation between the two leagues from the 2017–18 season onwards. The DEL2 champion would then have the opportunity to be promoted, provided it fulfilled the licensing requirements of the DEL, while the last-placed DEL club would be relegated.

After DEL club Hamburg Freezers returned their licence in May 2016 the Fischtown Pinguins announced that they had applied for a DEL licence and were interested in taking up Hamburg's place in the league, with the DEL intending to keep the number of clubs in the league at 14. On 1 July 2016 it was announced that the Pinguins had been granted a DEL licence for 2016–17.

Regular season
The regular season saw one new club in the league, EHC Freiburg while the Heilbronner Falken, originally relegated at the end of the 2014–15 season, remained in the league after EV Landshut was relegated for financial reasons.

Playoffs

Championship
The championship play-offs:

Relegation
The relegation play-offs:

References

External links
 Official website

2015–16 in European second tier ice hockey leagues
2015-16 DEL2
2015–16 in German ice hockey